Leo Kereselidze (1885 – 1944) was a Georgian military figure, politician and journalist involved in the Georgian national movement against the Russian and later Soviet domination.

Early in his twenties, Keresselidze was involved in the Russian Revolution of 1905 and took part in attacks against Russian officials and military as well as in the running of a cargo of guns to the port of Sukhum-Kale. He subsequently moved to Western Europe and obtained a Ph.D. degree from the University of Geneva. In 1913, he joined a group of Georgian patriots in the Committee of Independent Georgia, and engaged in journalism, co-editing with his brother Georges Keresselidze a Geneva-based Georgian newspaper Tavisupali Sakartvelo (“Free Georgia”) from 1913 to 1914, and then working for a Berlin-based Kartuli Gazeti (“Georgian Newspaper”) from 1916 to 1918. In 1914, at the eve of World War I, the Committee moved to Germany and sought the German aid in restoring the independence of Georgia from Russia. Keresselidze led a military unit of Georgian volunteers, the Georgian Legion, which fought on the German side and was transferred to the Ottoman-Russian Caucasus front. Keresselidze tried to negotiate an alliance with the Ottoman Empire, but refused to accept its suzerainty over a potentially independent Georgia. He was subsequently promoted to major general, but the Legion was disbanded due to his disagreement with the Ottoman government. Keresselidze was then involved in diplomacy between Georgians and Germans, and staging subversions against the Russian troops. After the collapse of the Russian armies in the Caucasus and the proclamation of Georgian independence in May 1918, Keresselidze was able to his own country and helped create national army divisions. The 1921 Red Army invasion of Georgia forced him into exile to Germany where he was among the founding members and a secretary general of the right-leaning nationalist organization Tetri Giorgi. Not long before his death, he helped establish a new political organization of Georgian émigrés, the Union of Georgian Traditionalists.

Keresselidze's revolutionary career is the subject of a fictionalized biography Unending Battle (London, 1934) by the British army officer and writer Harold Courtenay Armstrong (1891–1943).

References 

Generals from Georgia (country)
Journalists from Georgia (country)
1885 births
1944 deaths
People of World War I from Georgia (country)
20th-century journalists